The Alexander von Humboldt German International School Montreal (AvH) is an international private co-educationnal multilingual (German, English and French) school located in Baie-D'Urfé, Quebec, a West Island suburb of Montreal. It was founded in 1980 to educate the German community of Montreal.

History 
Founded in 1980, the AvH school opens its doors in Notre-Dame-de-Grâce district in Montreal to further moved in 1984 in a new building located in Baie-D’Urfé. Originally, it started with 22 students and now the school hosts more than 300 students. The school was founded to offer a German education to immigrants from Germany to Quebec. Today, the school serves a much greater community (e.g. Germans, Canadians, Americans, Italians, etc.).

The school is funded through school fees, donations, and support from the Federal Government of the Federal Republic of Germany.

Student body
, there were 300 students, of which 66% came from non-German-speaking households. The remainder came from German-speaking households.

Operations
The school cooperates with the Goethe Institute in order to promote German culture in the Montreal area.

Curriculum
Even though the school is not funded by the government of Quebec, it follows the standards of the Quebec Ministry of Education. Therefore, the students receive the provincial diploma upon graduation from high school.

Students may not choose to graduate at Grade 11 with the Diplôme des études secondaires and go on to CEGEP; but stay until Grade 12 and get the German International Abitur (DIA). Students may also earn the Deutsches Sprachdiplom, a certificate in German proficiency at grade 12.

The school has courses taught in German, French, and English. In PreKindergarten and Kindergarten courses are mostly in German while French and English courses are introduced in the first grade. The only classes taught in French and/or English are the non-German language classes.

Diplomas Offered

Academic administration 
Principal: Dr. Martin Braun
Vice-Principal: Tobias Grygier
Principal Elementary School: Gerd Jonetz
Preschool Coordinator: Kerstin Essig

See also
 Canadians of German ethnicity

References

Further reading
  Meune, Manuel. Les Allemands du Québec: Parcours et discours d'une communauté méconnue. Montréal: Méridien, 2003. . - AvH is discussed in subchapter 6
  "Bekanntmachung der deutsch-quebecischen Vereinbarung über die Alexander von Humboldt-Schule Montreal." Bundesgesetzblatt (Germany) Teil II, 1992, Nr. 12 vom 24.04.1992. - Direct PDF link (Archive)
  "ENTENTE ENTRE LE GOUVERNEMENT DU QUÉBEC ET LE GOUVERNEMENT DE LA RÉPUBLIQUE FÉDÉRALE D'ALLEMAGNE CONCERNANT L'ÉCOLE ALLEMANDE "ALEXANDER VON HUMBOLDT-SCHULE MONTREAL"" (Archive). September 1992.
  "Erfahrungsbericht Alexander von Humboldt-Schule Montreal." Humboldt University of Berlin.

External links
 

German-Canadian culture in Quebec
German international schools in Canada
International schools in Quebec
Private schools in Quebec
Elementary schools in Quebec
High schools in Quebec
1980 establishments in Canada
Preparatory schools in Quebec
Educational institutions established in 1980
Baie-D'Urfé